Quality Control: Control The Streets, Volume 1 is a compilation album released by American record label Quality Control. The album was released on December 8, 2017, by Quality Control Music, Motown Records and Capitol Records. It features artists from the label such as Migos, Lil Yachty, Lil Baby, Marlo, Kollision and City Girls. It has guest appearances from Cardi B, Tee Grizzley, MoneyBagg Yo, Kodak Black, Travis Scott, Gucci Mane, Nicki Minaj, Ty Dolla Sign, Eurielle, YRN Lingo, Young Thug and Mango Foo. Meanwhile, the album's production was handled by DJ Durel, Southside, Murda Beatz, Earl The Pearl and many others.

Background
On December 6, 2017, the label's CEO Kevin "Coach K" Lee confirmed the compilation was close to release.

Singles
The album's first single, "Too Hotty" with Migos featuring British singer Eurielle, was released on May 26, 2017. The album's second single, "On Me" with Lil Yachty and Young Thug, was released on September 29, 2017. The album's third single, "My Dawg (Remix)" with Lil Baby and Kodak Black featuring Quavo and Moneybagg Yo, was released on December 5, 2017. The album's fourth single, "Ice Tray" with Quavo and Lil Yachty, was released on December 10, 2017. The album's fifth single, "Fuck Dat Nigga" with City Girls, was released on January 8, 2018.

Track listing

Charts

Weekly charts

Year-end charts

References

2017 compilation albums
Motown albums
Capitol Records albums
Universal Music Group albums
Record label compilation albums
Quality Control Music albums
Southern hip hop compilation albums
Albums produced by Frank Dukes
Albums produced by Honorable C.N.O.T.E.
Albums produced by Jake One
Albums produced by Murda Beatz
Albums produced by Southside (record producer)
Albums produced by Cubeatz